Evening Star is the second studio album by British musicians Robert Fripp and Brian Eno. It was recorded from 1974 to 1975 and released in December 1975 by Island Records.

Background and recording 
This album's recording and the preceding seven-show European tour by Fripp and Eno marked Fripp's first output after disbanding King Crimson and his last before temporarily retiring from music (at the time thought to be permanently) to study at the International Academy for Continuous Education in Sherborne House.

Content 
AllMusic described Evening Star as "a less harsh, more varied affair, closer to Eno's then-developing idea of ambient music than what had come before in (No Pussyfooting)". The first three tracks are serene, gentle tape-looped guitar textures performed by Fripp and accented with treatments, synthesizer and piano by Eno. Track four, "Wind on Wind", is a short excerpt from Eno's solo project Discreet Music, released a week after Evening Star. It is not an exact duplication from that release, being mixed slightly differently. Eno had originally intended Fripp to use the material which became Discreet Music as a backing tape to play over in improvised live performances.

The second half of the album is a twenty-eight-minute piece of drone music titled "An Index of Metals", in which guitar notes are accumulated in a loop, with distortion increasing as the track progresses.

The album's cover is a painting by the artist Peter Schmidt.

Release 

Evening Star was released in December 1975 by Island Records.

Evening Star is the only Fripp album to be released during his retirement.

Legacy 
Tracks from Evening Star were used as music in The Hitchhiker's Guide to the Galaxy Primary Phase. "Wind on Water" and "Wind on Wind" were included on the soundtrack to the 1983 film Breathless.

Track listing 
All tracks written by Brian Eno and Robert Fripp, except "Wind on Wind" by Eno.

 Side A

 "Wind on Water" – 5:30
 "Evening Star" – 7:48
 "Evensong" – 2:53
 "Wind on Wind" – 2:56

 Side B

 "An Index of Metals" – 28:36

Personnel 
 Robert Fripp – guitar
 Brian Eno – tape loops, synthesizer, piano
 Peter Schmidt – cover painting

References 

Works cited

External links 
 

Brian Eno albums
Robert Fripp albums
1975 albums
Albums produced by Brian Eno
Albums produced by Robert Fripp
E.G. Records albums
Collaborative albums
Ambient albums by English artists
Island Records albums